The  is a prefectural museum in Chūō-ku, Chiba, Chiba Prefecture, Japan. The museum opened in 1989 with a focus on the natural history and history of the Bōsō Peninsula.

See also

 List of Historic Sites of Japan (Chiba)
 Chiba Prefectural Museum of Art

References

External links
  Natural History Museum and Institute, Chiba
  Natural History Museum and Institute, Chiba

Museums in Chiba Prefecture
Prefectural museums
Buildings and structures in Chiba (city)
Museums established in 1989
1989 establishments in Japan